Renatinho is a hypocorism of the name Renato and means "Little Renato" or "Renato Jr." in Portuguese.

Renatinho may refer to:

 Renatinho (footballer, born 1987), Brazilian football forward
 Renatinho (footballer, born May 1988), Brazilian football defender
 Renatinho (footballer, born October 1988), Brazilian football midfielder
 Renatinho (footballer, born 1991), Brazilian football midfielder
 Renatinho (footballer, born 1992), Brazilian football midfielder

See also
 Renato

Nicknames in association football